Zisa Corona is a corona found on the planet Venus at Latitude 12° North, Longitude 221° East. It has a diameter of 850 kilometers, and is the 3rd largest corona on Venus.

It is named for Zisa a German/Nordic harvest goddess and consort of Tyr.

Notes

Surface features of Venus